Samoana strigata, common name the "Polynesian tree snail", is a species of tropical, air-breathing land snail, a terrestrial, pulmonate, gastropod mollusc in the family Partulidae.

Distribution
This species is endemic to Nuku Hiva and Ua Huka, Marquesas Islands, French Polynesia.

References

Fauna of French Polynesia
Samoana
Gastropods described in 1868
Taxobox binomials not recognized by IUCN